Commentaria in Aristotelem Graeca [edita consilio et auctoritate academiae litterarum Regiae Borussicae] (CAG) (Greek Commentaries on Aristotle [edited by order and authority of the Prussian Royal Academy of literary studies]) is the standard collection of extant ancient Greek commentaries on Aristotle. The 23 volumes in the series were released between the years 1882 and 1909 by the publisher Reimer. Many of these commentaries have since been translated into English by the Ancient commentators project.

External links
 .
 Digitalised Volumes at archive.org.
 Ancient Greek OCR of the above archive.org volumes, provided at the Lace collection of Mount Allison University. An open source XML version of the Commentaria in Aristotelem Graeca has been made available by the Open Greek and Latin Project at the University of Leipzig in collaboration with Lace.
  Ancient Commentators Project edited by Richard Sorabji.
 The Aristotelian Commentators: A Bibliographical Guide (PDF) by John Sellars.